Mah Khatuni (also Romanized as Māh Khātūnī and Mah Khatooni) is a village in Tiab Rural District, in the Central District of Minab County, Hormozgan Province, Iran. At the 2006 census, its population was 177, in 35 families.

References 

Populated places in Minab County